Ronald Reagan announced his candidacy for President of the United States on November 20, 1975. He won primaries in several states, but eventually lost the nomination to incumbent president Gerald Ford at the 1976 Republican National Convention. If Reagan had won the Republican nomination, it would have been the first time since 1968 that an incumbent president was not nominated by his party.

Background

In 1976, Reagan challenged incumbent President Gerald Ford in a bid to become the Republican Party's candidate for president. Reagan soon established himself as the conservative candidate with the support of like-minded organizations such as the Conservative Party of New York State and the American Conservative Union, which became key components of his political base, while Ford was considered a more moderate Republican.

Reagan had been viewed as a leading candidate for some time, and led a Gallup poll in October 1973 with 29% of the vote. In polling in June 1975, Ford led Reagan by 41%-20% in a large field, or 61%-33% in a head-to-head matchup.

At the height of the campaign, Reagan aide Edwin Meese conducted some research into the logistics of a presidential transition. Meese had conversations on the subject with people who had previously worked for Richard Nixon and Gerald Ford.

Primaries
Reagan's campaign relied on a strategy crafted by campaign manager John Sears of winning a few primaries early to damage the inevitability of Ford's likely nomination.

In the run-up to the New Hampshire primary, Ford attacked Reagan's plan to cut $90 billion from the federal budget, as well as Reagan's plans for Social Security.  Reagan's stump speeches included attacks on welfare queens, as well as other attacks on government welfare programs. After a heated campaign, Reagan lost by 1317 votes, 54,824-53,507.

Reagan would lose the next two competitive primaries, in Florida and Illinois.  In Florida, Reagan lost 53%-47% and in Illinois by 59%-40%. Despite pressure to leave the race, Reagan pledged to stay in the race through the convention.

The Texas campaign lent renewed hope to Reagan, when he swept all 96 delegates chosen in the May 1 primary, with four more awaiting at the state convention. Much of the credit for that victory came from the work of three co-chairmen, including Ernest Angelo, the mayor of Midland, and Ray Barnhart of Houston, whom Reagan as President would appoint in 1981 as director of the Federal Highway Administration.

Endorsements

All individuals are members or supporters of the Republican Party, unless otherwise stated.

U.S. Senators
 Sen. Strom Thurmond (R-SC) 
 Sen. Richard Schweiker (R-PA) 
 Sen. Paul Laxalt (R-NV) 
 Sen. James L. Buckley (C-NY) 
 Sen. James A. McClure (R-ID) 
 Sen. Jesse Helms (R-NC)

U.S. Reprensentatives 
 Rep. Thomas B. Curtis (R-SC) 
 Rep. H. R. Gross (R-IA) 
 Rep. Phil Crane (R-IL) 
 Rep. Ron Paul (R-TX)

State Officials
 Governor Louie Nunn (R-KY) 
 Governor Meldrim Thomson Jr. (R-NH)

Actors
 James Stewart 
 John Wayne

Other People
 Morton Blackwell 
 Edwin Meese

Convention

However, as the GOP convention neared, Ford appeared close to victory. Acknowledging his party's moderate wing, Reagan chose moderate Senator Richard Schweiker of Pennsylvania as his running mate if nominated. Nonetheless, Ford prevailed with 1,187 delegates to Reagan's 1,070.

Reagan's concession speech emphasized the dangers of nuclear war and the threat posed by the Soviet Union.

Republican primary results

Republican National Convention

Aftermath
Reagan campaigned for Ford in twenty states against the Democratic nominee, Jimmy Carter, who would win the general election. However, in Washington state, a faithless elector gave Reagan one electoral vote instead of Ford. In 1977, Ford told Lou Cannon that Reagan's primary challenge played a role in his own narrow loss to Carter.

Notes

References

Bibliography
 

Ronald Reagan
Republican Party (United States) presidential campaigns
1976 in the United States